Micklefield Welfare F.C. was an English football club located in Micklefield, Leeds, Yorkshire.

History
The club joined the Yorkshire League in 1966, and spent three seasons in the competition's Second Division before re-joining local football.

Records
Best League performance: 7th, Yorkshire League Division 2, 1967–68

References

Defunct football clubs in England
Yorkshire Football League
Mining association football teams in England
Defunct football clubs in West Yorkshire